Bans on communist symbols have been introduced or proposed in a number of countries as part of their decommunization policies.

General bans

Indonesia 

"Communism / Marxism–Leninism" (official terminology) was banned in Indonesia following the aftermath of the 30 September coup attempt and the subsequent anti-communist killings, by the adoption of TAP MPRS no. 25/1966 in the 1966 MPRS General Session and Undang Undang no. 27/1999 in 1999 (the corresponding explanatory memorandums of whom explain that "[Communism / Marxism-Leninism includes] the struggle fundaments and tactics taught by... Stalin, Mao Tse Tung et cetera..."), which are still in force. The law does not explicitly declare a ban on symbols of communism, but Indonesian police frequently use the law to arrest people displaying them. Some of its violators were people with no knowledge of symbols of communism, in which cases the authorities frequently freed them with only minor punishment or small fine applied. The display of such symbols in an attempt to propagate "Communist / Marxist-Leninist" ideals are considered a high treason, and could be punished by up to 20 years imprisonment. This makes Indonesia a country with a very strict anti-communist policy compared to other countries that also practiced anti-communism.

Other socialist and left-wing related symbols, while not officially prohibited by law (as democratic socialism itself remained acceptable in the country) are still widely condemned by the Indonesian government and considered as being closely related to Communism in general. These include the red star, the socialist heraldry, the red flag, and anthems or slogans such as The Internationale and "Workers of the world, unite!". Despite this, The Internationale was still remained in use during International Labour Day.

In addition, since the New Order regime took power in 1967, the hammer and sickle has been highly stigmatized in the country, similar to the stigma surrounding Nazi symbolism in the Western world and the Imperial Japanese flag in South Korea. As such, displaying the symbol in public, even without any political intentions, is still regarded as highly offensive, especially among Muslims and political Islamists due to alleged religious persecution by the Indonesian Communist Party in the years leading up to the 1965 unrest, which primarily targets Muslims.

Indonesia is the one of the first countries in the world to ban communist symbols, not including the Axis countries during World War II.

In April 2017, Indonesian police detained a Malaysian tourist at a hotel in Mataram for wearing a T-shirt with an image of the hammer and sickle symbol. The tourist was not aware that communist symbols were banned in Indonesia. The police seized the T-shirt and released the tourist after giving him a warning. In May 2018, a Russian tourist was also detained by police in Bali for displaying a Soviet victory banner, which also contains the symbol.

Ukraine 
In April 2015, the Verkhovna Rada passed a law banning communist and Nazi symbols following worsening tensions with Russia. Earlier, in 2012, the city of Lviv in Western Ukraine banned the public display of communist symbols. On 17 December 2015, all communist parties were officially banned in Ukraine. Singing or playing the former anthem of the Soviet Union, any other former anthems of the Soviet Republics, or The Internationale is punishable with a sentence of up to five years in prison. In July 2019, the Constitutional Court upheld the law, equating communism to Nazism.

Bans on certain symbols

Georgia 
In Georgia the use of Soviet-era symbols on government buildings is prohibited, as is their display in public spaces, although this law is rarely enforced by authorities. A ban on communist symbols was first proposed in 2010, but it failed to define the applicable sanctions. In 2014, there was a proposal to amend the ban to introduce clearer parameters.

Germany 
The flag and emblem of the defunct Communist Party of Germany (KPD) is still banned in the country under section 86a of the German criminal code, while the hammer and sickle symbol itself is considered a universal symbol and is legally used by the contemporary German Communist Party (DKP) and various other organisations and media.

Latvia 
In June 2013, the Latvian parliament approved a ban on the display of Soviet and Nazi symbols at all public events. The ban involves flags, anthems, uniforms, Nazi swastika, and the Soviet hammer and sickle.

Lithuania 
Lithuania banned Soviet and Nazi symbols in 2008 (Article 18818 of the Code of Administrative Offences) under the threat of a fine. Collection, antiquarian trade and educational activities are exempt from the ban. Article 5 of the Law on Meetings prohibits meetings involving Nazi and Soviet imagery.

South Korea 
Similar to West Germany's ban on the East German flag, the North Korean flag and the flag of the Workers' Party of Korea are prohibited in South Korea as an unconstitutional symbol though some exceptions exist.

Former bans

Hungary 
Hungary had a law (Article 269/B of the Criminal Code (2000)) that banned the use of symbols of fascist and communist dictatorships. The same year the Constitutional Court upheld the law when it was challenged, claiming that the involved restriction of the freedom of expression was justified. In July 2008 the European Court of Human Rights considered the challenge of Attila Vajnai who was charged with a misdemeanor for use of the red star and declared the Hungarian law to be in violation of the freedom of expression. The Court recognised the gross violations by the Nazi and communist regimes; however, it noted that modern Hungary is a stable democracy with negligible chance of dictatorship, therefore restrictions on the freedom of expression have no justification in the country in the form of a "clear, pressing and specific social need". Eventually the law was annulled in 2013 by the Constitutional Court, citing the lack of precise definition and the European Court of Human Rights. In March 2017, Prime Minister Viktor Orbán introduced a draft law that outlaws merchandise featuring "totalitarian symbols", which includes symbols like the Nazi swastika or the communist five-pointed red star. This included the red star on the logo of the Dutch brewing company Heineken, which the company claimed has no communist origins or political connotations, and which the company will defend like all other trademarks.

Moldova 
In 2009, such a ban was proposed in Moldova by parliamentarian Oleg Serebryan, and the law came into effect in 2012. The Constitutional Court of Moldova found it unconstitutional and overturned it in 2013.

Taiwan (Republic of China) 
The Kuomintang government in Taiwan outlawed the flag of the People's Republic of China in 1952, pursuant to the Temporary Provisions against the Communist Rebellion in the country's constitution. The temporary provisions were repealed in 1991, but a general ban on communist ideology and symbolism in the National Security Law of the Republic of China, promulgated in 1976, was not annulled until 2011.

In late 2020, a legislator from the Democratic Progressive Party proposed an amendment to the National Security Law which would ban the public display of the flag of the People's Republic of China. However, no such legislation has been passed.

United States 
During the Red Scare of 1919–20 in the United States, many states passed laws forbidding the display of red flags, including Minnesota, South Dakota, Oklahoma, and California.  In Stromberg v. California, the United States Supreme Court held that such laws were unconstitutional.

Proposed bans

Albania 
Albania's Institute for Communist Crimes (ICC) proposed a ban on communist-era films, sparking hostile reactions from the public.

Brazil 
In 2016, Eduardo Bolsonaro, a federal deputy for São Paulo and the son of then-deputy and future president Jair Bolsonaro, proposed a bill to criminalize the promotion of communism. The draft proposed that offenders be given two to five years in prison and a fine if they manufacture, commercialize, distribute or convey symbols or propaganda that use the hammer or sickle or any other means of dissemination favourable to communism. , the bill is in the Constitution and Justice Commission of the Chamber of Deputies of Brazil.

Bulgaria 
In Bulgaria, lawmakers voted on first reading of a proposed law on 24 November 2016 to make the public display of communist symbols illegal. The law, known as the "Criminal Nature of the Communist Regime", requires that signs and items created during the communist regime glorifying the former communist party and its leaders be removed from public places. The proposal, however, was never put to a second reading, never signed by the President of Bulgaria nor published in Bulgaria's State Gazette and hence never became law. Both the parliamentary session and convocation in which the law was proposed later ended, thus rendering the proposal dead.

Croatia 
As of 2017, the use of fascist and communist symbols is under review in Croatia. One of the discussions centered around the banning of the red stara symbol of the Yugoslav Partisans who led an anti-fascist resistance during World War IIas well as the flag of SFR Yugoslavia and the emblem of the Yugoslav People's Army.

Czech Republic 
In 1991, in Czechoslovakia the criminal code was amended with w § 260 which banned propaganda of movements which restricted human rights and freedoms, citing Nazism and communism. Later the specific mentions of these were removed citing their lack of clear legal definition. Nevertheless, the law itself was recognised as constitutional. However, in 2005, there was a petition in the Czech Republic to ban the promotion of communism and in 2007, there was a proposed amendment to the law to ban communist symbols. Both attempts failed.

Estonia 
In early 2007 the Riigikogu was proceeding a draft bill amending the Penal Code to make the public use of Soviet and Nazi symbols punishable if used in a manner disturbing the public peace or inciting hatred. The bill did not come into effect as it passed only the first reading in the Riigikogu.

European Union 
In January 2005, Vytautas Landsbergis, backed by other Members of the European Parliament, such as József Szájer from Hungary, urged a ban on the communist symbols in the European Union, in addition to Nazi symbols.

In February 2005, the European Commission rejected calls for a proposed Europe-wide ban on Nazi symbols to be extended to cover communist symbols as well on the basis that it was not appropriate to deal with this issue in rules aimed at combatting racism. However, this rejection did not rule out the individual member states having their own laws in this respect.

In December 2010, the European Commission published a report titled "The memory of the crimes committed by totalitarian regimes in Europe" addressed to the European Parliament and the Council of the European Union, in which it mentions the banning of communist symbols by some Member states (Czech Republic, Poland, Hungary, and Lithuania) and concludes that "the European Union has a role to play, within the scope of its powers in this area, to contribute to the processes engaged in the Member States to face up to the legacy of totalitarian crimes".

In September 2019, the European Parliament approved a joint motion for a "Resolution on the importance of European remembrance for the future of Europe" with 535 votes in favour, 66 against and 52 abstentions. Specifically, in points 17 and 18 of the resolution "expresses concern about the continued use of symbols belonging to totalitarian systems in the public sphere and for commercial purposes", as well as noting "the continued existence in public spaces in some Member States of monuments and memorials (parks, squares, streets etc.) glorifying totalitarian regimes, which paves the way for the distortion of historical facts about the consequences of the Second World War and for the propagation of the totalitarian political system".

Poland 
In 2009, in Poland § 2 to 4 were added to Article 256, which ban "fascist, communist or other totalitarian symbols" unless used "as part of artistic, educational, collecting or academic activity." On 19 July 2011, the Constitutional Tribunal of Poland found this ban partly unconstitutional due to the violation of freedom of expression. In June 2017, Poland updated its "decommunization" legislation to include Soviet propaganda monuments, prompting negative reactions from the Russian government. However, communist symbols are not prohibited by law in Poland.

Romania 
Law 51/1991, (article 3. h) on the National Security of Romania considers the following as threats to national security: "the initiation, organisation, perpetration, or the supporting in any way of the totalitarian or extremist actions of a communist, fascist, iron guardist, or of any other origin, of the racial, anti-Semitic, revisionist, separatist actions that can endanger in any way the unity and territorial integrity of Romania, as well as the instigation to deeds that can put in, danger the order of the state governed by the rule of law". However, symbols are not specifically mentioned in the law.

See also 
 Bans on Nazi symbols
 Communist chic
 Communist terrorism
 Crimes against humanity under communist regimes
 Denazification
 Hammer and sickle § Legal status
 Red star § Legal status
 Strafgesetzbuch section 86a

References 

Censorship
Decommunization
Symbols of communism
Iconoclasm
Anti-communism